Paul A. Mendelson is an English television, film and radio scriptwriter.

Early life and career
He studied law at Cambridge University, where he gained a first class honours degree, after attending Newcastle Royal Grammar School, Glasgow High School and Harrow County Grammar. For a short time he ran the family law department of a small firm of city solicitors and then became an advertising copywriter for Ogilvy and Mather. Whilst working as creative director for a major London advertising agency, he began writing his first television series.

Writing career
Paul Mendelson's first hit television series was the BBC Comedy May to December, which ran for 39 episodes, from 2 April 1989 to 27 May 1994 on BBC One and was nominated for BAFTA best comedy. It starred Anton Rodgers as a widower solicitor in love with a much younger woman. He then created and wrote the BBC series So Haunt Me about a family home haunted by the ghost of a Jewish mother, played by Miriam Karlin. The show was produced by Cinema Verity for the BBC and originally aired from 1992 to 1994. Mendelson's most recent television situation comedy series in the UK is My Hero which ran for six seasons on BBC One from February 2000 to September 2006. Based on his own experiences with testicular cancer he wrote the acclaimed ITV play Losing It, starring Martin Clunes, for which he was nominated Televisual Awards Best Writer 2007. Having also survived prostate cancer, Mendelson is actively involved in cancer awareness charities and events.

Current projects
Paul Mendelson created the original idea and is creative consultant on the DreamWorks Animation/Fox forthcoming series 'Neighbors from Hell'. He writes original plays for BBC radio and adapts Joyce Porter's Chief Inspector Dover novels for BBC Radio 4.  Mendelson is currently developing his BBC radio play 'A Meeting in Seville' as a movie.

Writing credits

Awards and nominations

References

External links

Paul Mendelson Interview

Alumni of the University of Cambridge
English television writers
English male screenwriters
English radio writers
Living people
Year of birth missing (living people)
Place of birth missing (living people)
British male television writers